Hitschmann is an unincorporated community in Barton County, Kansas, United States.  It is located northwest of Claflin on NE 180 Road between NE 100 Ave and NE 110 Ave, next to an abandoned railroad.

Education
The community is served by Central Plains USD 112 public school district.

References

Further reading

External links
 "The town of Hitschmann really goes as the wind blows" , The Hutchinson News, October 3, 2015.
 Barton County maps: Current, Historic, KDOT

Unincorporated communities in Kansas
Unincorporated communities in Barton County, Kansas